Margaret Maury, née Kerubo (born 15 May 1974 in Kenya) is a French long-distance runner who specializes in the 5000 metres. She changed nationality from her native Kenya in 2002.

Achievements

Personal bests
1500 metres - 4:11.40 min (2004)
3000 metres - 8:57.82 min (2004)
3000 metres steeplechase - 10:05.15 min (2001)
5000 metres - 14:43.90 min (2004)
10,000 metres - 32:01.01 min (2004)
Half marathon - 1:11:06 hrs (2001)
Marathon - 2:38:21 hrs (2000)

External links

1974 births
Living people
French female long-distance runners
French female steeplechase runners
Kenyan female long-distance runners
Kenyan female steeplechase runners
Athletes (track and field) at the 2004 Summer Olympics
Olympic athletes of France
Kenyan emigrants to France
Mediterranean Games gold medalists for France
Mediterranean Games medalists in athletics
Athletes (track and field) at the 2005 Mediterranean Games